Moroccan genetics encompasses the genetic history of the people of Morocco, and the genetic influence of this ancestry on world populations. It has been heavily influenced by geography.

In prehistoric times, the Sahara desert to the south and the Mediterranean Sea to the north were important geographical barriers. West Asia and Northeast Africa form a single land mass at the Suez. West Asian populations would have also been attracted to a wet Sahara, arriving either through the Suez, the Bab el-Mandeb or the Mediterranean.

As a result of these geographic influences, the genetic profile of the Moroccan population is a complex mosaic of autochthonous Maghrebi lineages, as well as Northeast African, European, West Asian and West African elements in variable degrees. Though Northwest Africa has experienced gene flow from the surrounding regions, it has also undergone long periods of genetic isolation in some parts. This has allowed distinctive genetic markers to evolve in some Maghrebi populations, especially in certain isolated Berber-speaking groups.

Prehistory and antiquity
The area of present-day Morocco has been thought to have been inhabited since Paleolithic times, sometime between 90,000 and 190,000 BC but that is no longer the case after the discovery of a 300,000 years Homo sapiens and instead, it is now suggested that it has been inhabited since primordial times by humans by the same evidence. During the Upper Paleolithic, the Maghreb was more fertile than it is today, resembling a savanna more than today's arid landscape. 22,000 years ago, the Aterian was succeeded by the Iberomaurusian culture, which shared similarities with Iberian cultures. Skeletal similarities have been observed between the Iberomaurusian Mechta-Afalou burials and European Cro-Magnon remains. The Iberomaurusian industry in Morocco was succeeded by the Capsian culture.

North Africa and Morocco were slowly drawn into the wider emerging Mediterranean world by the Phoenicians, who established trading colonies and settlements in the early Classical period. Mogador was a Phoenician colony as early as the early 6th century BC.

Morocco later became part of a North African empire headquartered in Carthage. The earliest known independent Moroccan state was the Berber kingdom of Mauretania under king Bocchus I. This kingdom in northern Morocco, not to be confused with the present state of Mauritania, dates at least to 110 BC.

The Roman Empire controlled this region from the 1st century BC, naming it Mauretania Tingitana. Christianity was introduced in the 2nd century AD and gained converts in the Roman towns, among slaves and some Berber farmers.

In the 5th century AD, as the Roman Empire declined, the region was invaded from the north first by the Vandals and then by the Visigoths. In the 6th century AD, northern Morocco was nominally part of the East Roman, or Byzantine Empire. Throughout this time, the Berber inhabitants in the high mountains of the interior of Morocco remained unsubdued.

Early Arab era
In 670 AD, the first Arab conquest of the North African coastal plain took place under Uqba ibn Nafi, a general serving under the Umayyads of Damascus. The Umayyad Muslims brought their language, their system of government, and Islam to Morocco. Many of the Berbers slowly converted to Islam, mostly after Arab rule had receded. The first independent Berber state in the area of modern Morocco was the Kingdom of Nekor, an emirate in the Rif Mountains. It was founded by Salih I ibn Mansur in 710, as a client state to the Rashidun Caliphate. After the outbreak of the Great Berber Revolt in 739, the Berbers formed other independent states such as the Miknasa of Sijilmasa and the Barghawata.

According to medieval legend, Idris ibn Abdallah had fled to Morocco after the Abbasids' massacre of his tribe in Iraq. He convinced the Awraba Berber tribes to break their allegiance to the distant Abbasid caliphs in Baghdad and he founded the Idrisid Dynasty in 788. The Idrisids established Fes as their capital and Morocco became a centre of Muslim learning and a major regional power. The Idrissids were ousted in 927 by the Fatimid Caliphate and their Miknasa allies. After Miknasa broke off relations with the Fatimids in 932, they were removed from power by the Maghrawa of Sijilmasa in 980.

Berber dynasties

From the 11th century onwards, a series of powerful Berber dynasties arose. Under the Almoravid dynasty and the Almohad dynasty dominated the Maghreb, much of present-day Spain and Portugal, and the western Mediterranean region. In the 13th and 14th centuries the Merinids held power in Morocco and strove to replicate the successes of the Almohads by military campaigns in Algeria and Iberia. They were followed by the Wattasids. In the 15th century, the Reconquista ended Muslim rule in central and southern Iberia and many Muslims and Jews fled to Morocco. Portuguese efforts to control the Atlantic coast in the 15th century did not greatly affect the interior of Morocco. According to Elizabeth Allo Isichei, "In 1520, there was a famine in Morocco so terrible that for a long time other events were dated by it. It has been suggested that the population of Morocco fell from 5 to under 3 million between the early sixteenth and nineteenth centuries."

Arab dynasties
In 1549, the region fell to successive Arab dynasties claiming descent from the Islamic prophet, Muhammad: first the Saadi dynasty who ruled from 1549 to 1659, and then the Alaouite dynasty, who remained in power since the 17th century.

Under the Saadi Dynasty, the country repulsed Ottoman incursions and a Portuguese invasion at the battle of Ksar el Kebir in 1578. The reign of Ahmad al-Mansur brought new wealth and prestige to the Sultanate, and a large expedition to West Africa inflicted a crushing defeat on the Songhay Empire in 1591. However, managing the territories across the Sahara proved too difficult. After the death of al-Mansur the country was divided among his sons.

In 1666 Morocco was reunited by the Alaouite Dynasty, who have been the ruling house of Morocco ever since. Morocco was facing aggression from Spain and the Ottoman Empire lies pressing westward. The Alaouites succeeded in stabilizing their position, and while the kingdom was smaller than previous ones in the region, it remained quite wealthy. Against the opposition of local tribes Ismail Ibn Sharif (1672–1727) began to create a unified state. With his Jaysh d'Ahl al-Rif (the Riffian Army) he seized Tangier from the English in 1684 and drove the Spanish from Larache in 1689.

Morocco was the first nation to recognize the fledgling United States as an independent nation in 1777. In the beginning of the American Revolution, American merchant ships in the Atlantic Ocean were subject to attack by the Barbary pirates. On 20 December 1777, Morocco's Sultan Mohammed III declared that American merchant ships would be under the protection of the sultanate and could thus enjoy safe passage. The Moroccan-American Treaty of Friendship, signed in 1786, stands as the U.S.'s oldest non-broken friendship treaty.

Genetic evidence
A genetic study published in January 2012 stated that the indigenous North West African ancestry appears most closely related to populations outside of Africa but "divergence between Moroccan people and Near Eastern/Europeans likely precedes the Holocene (>12,000 ya) and The Paleolithic (>40.000BC)."

Recent studies make clear no significant genetic differences exists between Arabic-speaking Moroccan populations and non-Arabic speaking Moroccan populations. The human leukocyte antigen HLA DNA data suggest that most Moroccans, both those of non-Arab ethnolinguistic identity and those of Arab ethnolinguistic identity, are of Berber origin, and that the genealogical true Arabs from Arabia who invaded North Africa and parts of Southern Europe did not substantially contribute to the gene pool. According to a 2000 article in European Journal of Human Genetics, Moroccans from North-Western Africa, although still with many differences, are genetically closer to Southern Europeans than to Sub-Saharan Africans of Bantu ethnicity.

There is a substantial contribution of Sub-Saharan African DNA in about a third of Moroccan people, with the most West Eurasian Berbers showing contributions of 1-10% Sub-Saharan African DNA on average. Non Berber populations showed substantially more Sub-Saharan African DNA contributions (up to 55%). When it comes to Sub-Saharan African contributions, differences among Berber populations were not significant. Coudray et al. (2009) and Hernández et al. (2015) showed an increased representation of Sub-Saharan African mtDNA haplogroups in Figuig Berbers (i.e., high prevalence of L-derived lineages).

The different loci studied revealed close similarity between the Berbers and other North African groups, mainly with Moroccan Arabic-speakers, which is in accord with the hypothesis that the current Moroccan population has a strong Berber background. Various population genetics studies along with historians such as Gabriel Camps and Charles-André Julien lend support to the idea that the bulk of the gene pool of modern Northwest Africans, irrespective of linguistic group, is derived from the Berber populations of the pre-Islamic period.

Moroccan Y-DNA chromosome

E-M215

E1b1b (E-M215) is the most prevalent haplogroup in North Africa. E-M215 and its dominant subclade E-M35 is thought to have emerged in East-Africa about 22,400 years ago, and would have later dispersed into North Africa and from there into West Asia.
The E1b1b1 clade is presently found in various forms in Morocco. Total E1b1b1 (E-M35) frequencies reached at 93.8% in Moroccans.

E-M215 has two ancient branches that contain all known modern E-M215 men, E-M35 and E-M281. Of these two, the only branch that has been confirmed in a native population outside of Ethiopia is E-M35, which in turn has four known branches, E-V68, E-Z827, E-V6 and E-V92. E-V68 and E-V257 have been found in highest numbers in North Africa and the Horn of Africa; but also in lower numbers in parts of the Middle East and Europe, and in isolated populations of Southern Africa.

E1b1b is dominant among Afro-Asiatic speakers. The linguistic group and carriers of its E-M35 lineage have a high probability to have arisen and dispersed together from the region of origin of this language family, amongst populations with an Afro-Asiatic speaking history.

All major sub-branches of E-M35 are thought to have originated in the same general area as the parent clade: in North Africa, Horn of Africa, or nearby areas of the Near East. Some branches of E-M35 left Africa many thousands of years ago. For example,  estimated that E-M78 (called E1b1b1a1 in that paper) has been in Europe longer than 10,000 years.

E-M81

E1b1b1b1 (E-M81), formerly E1b1b1b, E3b1b, and E3b2, is the most common Y chromosome haplogroup in Morocco, dominated by its subclade E-M183.

It is thought to have originated in North Africa 14,200 years ago. Its parent clade E1b1b (E-M215) is believed to have first appeared in Horn of Africa about 42,600 years ago.

This haplogroup reaches a mean frequency of 85% in North Africa. It decreases in frequency from approximately 80% or more in some Moroccan Berber populations, including Saharawis, to approximately 28% to the east of this range in Egypt.

Due to the clade's prevalence among these Berber groups and others such as Mozabites, Riffians, Chleuhs, Middle Atlas and Kabyle, it is sometimes referred to as a genetic Berber marker.

This phylogenetic tree of The Berber haplogroup subclades is based on the YCC 2008 tree  and subsequent published research as summarized by ISOGG.

E1b1b1b (L19, V257)
E1b1b1b1 (M81)
E1b1b1b1a (M107) .
E1b1b1b1b (M183)  This clade is extremely dominant within E-M81. In fact, while  continues to describe this as a sub-clade of E-M81, and ISOGG defers to Karafet et al., all data seems to imply that it should actually be considered phylogenetically equivalent to M81.
E1b1b1b1b1 (M165) .
E1b1b1b1b2 (L351) Found in two related participants in The E-M35 Phylogeny Project.

Average North African Moroccan Berbers have frequencies of E3b3 in the +80%.  study shows a frequency of E3b1b of 28/33 or 84.8% in Berbers from Marrakesh. With the rest of the frequencies being 1/33=3% E3a*, 1/33=3% E3b*, 1/33 or 3% E3b1a, and 1/33 or 3% E3b1c.

E1b1b (M81) are Proto-Berber marker E1b1b1b1a1 (M107) A reduced Proto-Berber lineage in Mali.

E-M78

The most basal and rare E-M78* paragroup has been found at lower frequencies in Moroccan Arabs. 
The sub-clade E-V65 is found in high levels in the Maghreb regions of far northern Africa.  report levels of about 20% amongst Libyan Arab lineages, and about 30% amongst Moroccan Arabs. It appears to be less common amongst Berbers, but still present in levels of >10%. The authors suggest a North African origin for this lineage. In Europe, only a few individuals were found in Italy and Greece.

 studied the beta cluster in Europe. They found small amounts in Southern Italy, but also traces in Cantabria, Portugal and Galicia, with Cantabria having the highest level in Europe in their study, at 3.1% (5 out of 161 people).

Other frequencies of E1b1b1a1c (E-V22) is reported by Cruciani et al. (2007) include Moroccan Arabs (7.27%, 55 people) and Moroccan Jews (8%, 50 people).

Moroccan Y-DNA Haplogroups

J-P209 

Haplogroup J-P209 is believed to have arisen roughly 31,700 years ago in Southwest Asia (31,700±12,800 years ago according to ).
Haplogroup J-P209 is found in greatest concentration in Southwestern Arabian Peninsula. Outside of this region, haplogroup J-P209 has a presence in North Africa: Algeria (up to 35%) , Tunisia (up to 31%), Morocco (up to 20%) , Egypt (up to 20%) .

Other haplogroups 

Concerning E-M123 without checking for the E-M34 SNP is found at small frequencies in Morocco A Low regional percentages for E-M123 was reported in Moroccan Berbers around 3%. E-M123 is also known as E1b1b1b2a (ISOGG 2012).

Eurasian haplogroups such as Haplogroup J and Haplogroup R1 have also been observed at very minimal frequencies. A thorough study by Cruciani et al. (2004) which analyzed populations from Morocco concludes that the North African pattern of Y-chromosomal variation (including both J1 and R1b haplogroups) is largely of Neolithic origin, which suggests that the Neolithic transition in this part of the world was accompanied by demic diffusion of Berber-speaking pastoralists from the Algerian Desert into Eastern Morocco, although later papers have suggested that this date could have been as long as ten thousand years ago, with the transition from the Oranian to the Capsian culture in North Africa.

Haplogroups G and T are rarely found in Morocco, In 147 samples taken in Morocco, 1% were found to be G.

In another study 1% of 312 samples in Morocco were G.

Another study gathered samples only from hamlets in Morocco's Azgour Valley, where none of 33 samples were determined G. These hamlets were selected because they were felt to be typically Berber in composition.

A study of 20 Moroccan Jews found 30% were G. The tested men were then apparently living in Israel. Another study of Jewish men found 19.3% of 83 Jewish men from Morocco belonged to haplogroup G. over G Moroccan samples are Likely Positive on the SNP G2a2b Haplogroup, it has been identified in neolithic human remains in Europe dating between 5000 and 3000BC.
Furthermore, the majority of all the male skeletons from the European Neolithic period have so far yielded Y-DNA belonging to this haplogroup like the mummified remains of Ötzi the Iceman, The National Geographic Society places haplogroup G origins in the Middle East 30,000 years ago and presumes that people carrying the haplogroup took part in the spread of the Neolithic into Africa and then Europe  Two percent of Arab Moroccans and 0% to 8% of Berber Moroccans of Asni Oasis were likewise found to be G.

Haplogroup T is found amongst central Berbers of Asni Oasis near the Algerian frontiers at 1,9% and  observed in Moroccan Jews at 4%.

The most basal and rare E1a* paragroup has been found at lower frequencies in samples obtained from Moroccan Berbers, and Sahrawis. dated around 45.000BC Linked to Back-Eurasian Migration from the Near East into North Africa along together with E1b1b during the Paleolithic times.

Haplogroup distributions in Moroccan Populations
The major components of Y-DNA haplogroups present in Moroccan Berbers (E3b ; 94%) are shared with European and neighboring North African and Near Eastern populations. Minor share of haplogroups also include those related to North West Africans (E1a, A1a; 1%), Near Easterners (J, G, T; 2,4%), Sub Saharans Africans (E3a; 1,7%) and Europeans (R1b, I1; 2%) affinity.

Some of the major percentages identified were:

E1b1b: 56% - Typical of Afroasiatic-speaking populations.
J-P209: 20.4% - Typical of populations of the Arabian peninsula, the Levant and Caucasus, with a moderate distribution in Southeast Europe, North Africa, the Horn of Africa, Central Asia and South Asia.
R1b: 0.8% to 6.8% - Typical of Western Europeans, some West Asian peoples, the Sudanese Fulani and the Chadic-speaking peoples of Central Africa, and some Central Asian peoples (such as the Bashkirs, Turkmen and Uyghurs).
G: 0.4% - Typical of people from the Caucasus, and to a lesser extent the Middle East.
E1a: 0.5% - Rare haplogroup that has been found amongst Moroccan Berbers, Sahrawis, Southern Europeans, and some Chadic speakers in the Sahel.
E1b1a: 1.7% - Typical of Niger-Congo-speaking populations.
T: 0.4% - Widely distributed around West Eurasia.
I: 0.4% - It can be found in the majority of present-day European populations, with peaks in Northern and South-Eastern Europe. Haplogroup I1 Y-chromosomes have also been found among some populations of the Near East, the Caucasus, Northeast Africa and Central Siberia.

Berber Genetic Identity of Moroccans

The prehistoric populations of Morocco, who were ancestral to Berbers, were related to the wider group of Paleo-Mediterranean peoples.
The Afroasiatic family probably originated during the Mesolithic period, perhaps in the context of the Capsian culture. DNA analysis has found commonalities between Berber Moroccan populations and those of the Sami people of Scandinavia showing a link dating from around 9,000 years ago.

Around 5000 BC, the populations of North Africa were primarily descended from the makers of the Iberomaurusian and Capsian cultures, with a more recent intrusion associated with the Neolithic revolution. The proto-Berber tribes evolved from these prehistoric communities during the Late Bronze to Early Iron Age.

Genetic Prehistoric Expansions

DNA evidence suggests that during the Last Glacial Maximum, a period between 25,000 and 19,000 years ago, large ice sheets over a kilometer thick covered much of Northern Europe, making the region uninhabitable to humans. It is believed that human populations retreated south to warmer regions near the Mediterranean. Refugees during this period are believed to have been in Iberia, the Balkans and Italy and therefore was some gene flow from North Africa into Southern Europe.

After the glacial maximum, when the European climate warmed up, the refuges are thought to have been the source from which Europe was repopulated. Prehistoric African lineages that had been introduced into Iberia as refugees would have then dispersed all over Europe with the Northward expansion of humans. This could explain the presence of genetic lineages in Eastern Europe and as far north as Russia, that appear to have prehistoric links to Northwest Africa, mainly Morocco (see mtDNA). The expansion of human populations from Iberian refuges is also believed to have moved back to Morocco and Northwest Africa.

Neolithic to the end of the prehistoric

The change from hunting and gathering to agriculture during the Neolithic Revolution was a watershed in world history. The societies that first made the change to agriculture are believed to have lived in North Africa and Middle East around 10,000 BCE. Agriculture was introduced into Europe by migrating farmers from the Middle East. According to the demic diffusion model, these  Middle Eastern farmers either replaced or interbred with the local hunter-gather populations that had been living in Europe since the "out of Africa" migration.

It has been suggested that the first Middle Eastern farmers had North African influences mainly from the Capsian culture. There have been suggestions that some genetic lineages found in the Middle East arrived there during this period. The first Agricultural societies in the Middle East are generally thought to have emerged from the Natufian Culture, which existed in Palestine from 12,000 BCE-10,000 BCE. An important migration from North-West Africa occurred by the Ibero-Maurisians from Morocco across the Sinai appears to have occurred before the formation of the Natufian.

Genetic continuity in Morocco
In 2013, skeletons belonging to the makers of the Epipaleolithic Iberomaurusian culture, which were excavated at the prehistoric sites of Taforalt and Afalou, were analyzed for ancient DNA. All of the specimens belonged to maternal clades associated with either North Africa or the northern and southern Mediterranean littoral, indicating gene flow between these areas since the Epipaleolithic. The ancient Taforalt individuals carried the Y-DNA haplogroup E1b1b and the mtDNA haplogroups U6, H, JT and V, which points to population continuity in the region dating from the Iberomaurusian period.

Genetic Berber Heritage continuity of Moroccan Arabs

The cultural differentiation present in North Africa between Berber and Arab samples seems not to reflect genetic differences between both groups , as shown in the AMOVA analyses, and the MDS and PC analyses. If Arabs in Northern Africa were mostly descendants of Middle Eastern Arabs, the frequencies of haplogroups such as N, U1, U3, U7, and HV that are much more prevalent in the Middle East than elsewhere should be larger in North African Arabs than in Berbers. However, the opposite is observed : these haplogroups add up to 5% in North African Arabs but to 10% in Berbers.

The lack of differentiation between North African Arabs and Berbers has also been observed using other genetic markers such as classical markers; autosomal STRs, Alu insertion polymorphisms; and Y-chromosome lineages.

This pattern suggests that the Arabization of the area was mainly a cultural process, rather than a demographic replacement of the Berber populations that inhabited the region where the Arabic expansion took place.

Moroccan Mitochondrial mtDNA 
The Moroccan mitochondrial pool is essentially Berber in its structure, characterized by an "overall high frequency of Western Eurasian haplogroups" Represented by the Post-last glacial maximum expansion from Iberia to North Africa revealed by fine characterization of mtDNA HV haplogroup in Morocco is Estimated around 36% to 60%, a somehow lower frequency of sub-Saharan L lineages, and a significant (but differential) presence of North African haplogroups U6 and M1". And according to Cherni et al. 2008 "the post-Last glacial maximum expansion originating in Iberia not only led to the resettlement of Europe but also of North Africa".

Eurasian mtDNA (maternal) sequences, were detected at frequencies of 96% in Moroccan Berbers, 82% in Algerian Berbers and 78% in non-Berber Moroccans, compared with only 4% in a Senegalese population.

Until recently, some papers suggested that the distribution of the main L haplogroups in Morocco was mainly due to trans-Saharan slave trade. However, in September 2010, a thorough study about Berber mtDNA by Fregel. concluded that most of L haplogroups were much older and introduced by an ancient African gene flow  around 20,000 years ago.

Moroccan Northern Berbers have only 3% to 1% of SSA mtDNA, This north-south gradient in the sub-Saharan contribution to the gene pool is supported by Esteban et al.'', for the rest of mtDNA lineages mostly are Caucasian/West Eurasian, while Moroccan Arabs have more elevated SSA maternal admixture at around 21% to 36% Via L-mtDNA sequences, Highest frequencies of L-mtDNA is Reported to Moroccan Arabs of The Surrounding area of El jadida at 36% and this is largely ascribed to the slave trade.

Frequencies (> 1%) of L-mtDNA

See also 
Demographics of Morocco
Genetic history of North Africa
Genetic history of the Middle East
Genetic studies on Arabs

References

Society of Morocco
Moroccans
Science and technology in Morocco
Modern human genetic history